The 2017 Ladies Open Hechingen was a professional tennis tournament played on outdoor clay courts. It was the nineteenth edition of the tournament and was part of the 2017 ITF Women's Circuit. It took place in Hechingen, Germany, on 7–13 August 2017.

Singles main draw entrants

Seeds 

 1 Rankings as of 31 July 2017.

Other entrants 
The following players received a wildcard into the singles main draw:
  Anna Gabric
  Antonia Lottner
  Lena Rüffer
  Arina Gabriela Vasilescu

The following players received entry from the qualifying draw:
  Gréta Arn
  Deborah Chiesa
  Nicoleta Dascălu
  Tamara Korpatsch

The following player received entry as a lucky loser:
  Ludmilla Samsonova

Champions

Singles

 Tamara Korpatsch def.  Deborah Chiesa, 2–6, 7–6(7–5), 6–2

Doubles
 
 Camilla Rosatello /  Sofia Shapatava def.  Romy Kölzer /  Lena Rüffer, 6–2, 6–4

External links 
 2017 Ladies Open Hechingen at ITFtennis.com
 Official website

2017 ITF Women's Circuit
2017 in German tennis
Ladies Open Hechingen